Scarborough SC is a Canadian soccer team founded in 2014. The team is currently a member of the Canadian Soccer League, a league that is not sanctioned by a FIFA recognized body. The team plays home games out of Birchmount Stadium in the district of Scarborough, Toronto, Ontario. The team's colours are green, and black.

History 
Scarborough SC was formed in 2014 as an expansion franchise in the Canadian Soccer League. Marking the return of professional soccer to Scarborough, Toronto since 2007 when the Canadian Lions held the territorial rights. Team owner Angel Belchev hired the services of CSL veteran Kiril Dimitrov to recruit players, and assumed the duties of general manager, and as head coach/player. He brought in several players with European experience including CSL veterans. Overseas recruitment consisted of Dobrin Orlovski, Tihomir Kosturkov, Mladen Kukrika, and Aleksandar Malbasic. Several players were acquired from North York Astros like Joey Melo, Gabe Gala, Boris Miličić, Mark Jankovic, Jason Lopes, Jose Goncalves De Sousa, and Ricardo Munguía Pérez.

The club's first home venue was located at Downsview Park. In their debut season, the club finished tenth in the overall standings missing the final postseason spot by a goal difference. De Sousa finished as the club's top goalscorer with 15 goals. In preparations for the 2016 season, the club moved their home venue to Birchmount Stadium, and appointed Ricardo Munguia Perez as the new head coach. Perez's notable acquisitions were Canadian international Adrian Cann, Aleksandar Stojiljković, Adis Hasecic, Nemanja Simeunovic, Alon Badat, and Metodi Iliev. The 2016 season marked the first time Scarborough qualified for the postseason by finishing third, and posting the third best defensive record. Their playoff run was cut short after a 3-0 defeat to Hamilton City SC. 

In 2019, the team secured the CSL Championship after defeating FC Ukraine United.

Roster

Head coaches

 Kiril Dimitrov (2015)
 Ricardo Munguía (2016)
 Krum Bibishkov (2017)
 Zoran Rajović  (2018–2020)
 Mirko Medić (2021–)

Honours
CSL Championship: 2019, 2021
Canadian Soccer League First Division: 2020

Seasons

References

External links
 

Soccer clubs in Ontario
Scarborough, Toronto
Canadian Soccer League (1998–present) teams
Soccer clubs in Toronto
Association football clubs established in 2014
2014 establishments in Ontario